is a Bandai Namco Nintendo DS video game featuring the protagonists of the Kamen Rider Series.

Rider Generation 2

A sequel titled  was released on August 2, 2012. It features Kamen Rider Fourze from Kamen Rider Fourze as the main character, as well as various others secondary Kamen Riders.

This is the second to last original game ever released for the Nintendo DS in Japan. The final original title released for the system was Tokumei Sentai Go-Busters.

Rider Revolution

 was released on December 1, 2016. It features Kamen Rider Ex-Aid from Kamen Rider Ex-Aid as the main character, as well as various others secondary Kamen Riders.

External links
Rider Generation site 
Rider Generation 2 site 
Rider Revolution site 

2011 video games
Rider Generation
Nintendo DS games
Rider Generation 2
Crossover beat 'em ups
Japan-exclusive video games
Video games developed in Japan
Bandai Namco games